Perfect Stranger may refer to:

Books
 The Perfect Stranger (book), an autobiography by P. J. Kavanagh
 A Perfect Stranger (novel), a 1981 romance novel by Danielle Steel

Films and TV
 El Perfecto Desconocido, a 2011 film starring Colm Meaney
 Perfect Stranger (film), a 2007 suspense film
 The Perfect Stranger (film), a 2005 Christian film 
 Danielle Steel's A Perfect Stranger, a 1994 film
 "A Perfect Stranger" (Upstairs, Downstairs), tenth episode of the third series of the British television series, Upstairs, Downstairs

Music
 Perfect Stranger (musician), an Israeli psytrance music producer
 Perfect Stranger (band), an American country music quartet
 The Perfect Stranger, 1982 album by Jesse Colin Young
 Boulez Conducts Zappa: The Perfect Stranger, a 1984 album by Frank Zappa
 Perfect Stranger (Southern Pacific song), 1985 single recorded by US country music group Southern Pacific
 "The Perfect Stranger", a song from the 1988 album Riot in English by Dale Bozzio
 "Perfect Stranger", ninth song from Erasure's 1991 album Chorus
 Desconocida (aka Perfect Stranger), 1998 studio album by Marta Sanchez
 Perfect Stranger (Cheap Trick song), 2006 single by US rock band Cheap Trick
 Perfect Stranger (album), a 2008 album by K'Maro
 "Perfect Stranger", a song by The Donnas from their 2009 compilation album, Greatest Hits Vol. 16
 "Perfect Stranger" (Magnetic Man song), a 2010 song by Magnetic Man

See also
Perfect Strangers (disambiguation)
Stranger